Praxithea chavantina is a species of beetle in the family Cerambycidae. It was described by Lane in 1949.

References

Torneutini
Beetles described in 1949